Rafał Furman (born 18 July 1985) is a Polish cyclist. He competed in the men's team sprint at the 2004 Summer Olympics.

References

External links
 

1985 births
Living people
Polish male cyclists
Olympic cyclists of Poland
Cyclists at the 2004 Summer Olympics
People from Kołobrzeg